"Fearless" is a song recorded by American singer-songwriter Taylor Swift for her second studio album of the same name (2008). It was released to US country radio as the album's fifth and final single on January 4, 2010, by Big Machine Records. Swift wrote "Fearless" with Liz Rose and Hillary Lindsey while traveling on tour to promote her self-titled debut studio album (2006). With lyrics about a perfect first date, the song was chosen by Swift as the album's title track because it explores the courage to embrace the challenges of love, the overarching theme of all other songs. Produced by Swift and Nathan Chapman, it is a country pop and pop rock song with dynamic guitars.

Music critics praised "Fearless" for its production and lyrics. In the United States, the single peaked at number nine on the Billboard Hot 100 and was certified platinum by the Recording Industry Association of America (RIAA); it additionally peaked at number 10 on the Hot Country Songs chart. "Fearless" also entered charts in Canada and Spain. Swift performed the song on the Fearless Tour (2009–10); footage and behind the scenes of the tour were used to comprise a music video for "Fearless", directed by Todd Cassetty and released on February 17, 2010. After a dispute with Big Machine Records over the rights to the masters of her first six studio albums, Swift released Fearless (Taylor's Version), a re-recording of Fearless, on April 9, 2021, which includes the re-recording of "Fearless".

Background and release
"Fearless" was written by Swift in collaboration with Liz Rose and Hillary Lindsey and produced by Swift and Nathan Chapman. Swift conceived the song while touring as opening act to promote her eponymous debut album, Taylor Swift (2006). Despite the song describing the perfect date, Swift was not dating anyone or even "in the beginning states of dating anybody" while writing the song. Swift was inspired to write the song based on the perfect first date she wished he had experienced. While developing "Fearless", Swift explained the writing process: "I think sometimes when you’re writing love songs, you don’t write them about what you’re going through at the moment, you write about what you wish you had." Swift described the song's greater concept to be about "the fearlessness of falling in love", writing that "no matter how many times you get hurt, you will always fall in love again." After completing the song, Swift deeply deliberated her personal definition of the word "fearless". To her, "fearless doesn't mean you're completely unafraid and it doesn't mean that you're bulletproof. It means that you have a lot of fears, but you jump anyway", an idea that convinced her to title the album Fearless. The song was first released as a promotional single from the album on October 14, 2008, as part of Countdown to Fearless, an exclusive campaign by the iTunes Store; it was later released as the fifth and final single from Fearless on January 4, 2010.

Composition and lyrics

"Fearless" is a country pop and pop rock song written about the fearlessness of falling in love. Lyrically, the song narrates Swift's ideal first date. The song is four minutes and one second in length. Musically, "Fearless" is set in common time and the key of F major with a moderate tempo of 100 beats per minute. Swift's vocals span from F3 to C5 and the song follows the chord progression of F–C–Gm–B♭-C. Some critics, such as Rob Sheffield of Rolling Stone, noticed that the song features various of Swift's most commonly used tropes, such as rain, cars, fancy dresses, and overcoming timidity. Writing for  Blender magazine, Sheffield opined the lyrics "And I don't know why but with you / I'd dance in a storm in my best dress, fearless" demonstrated how Swift enjoyed making a scene, adding that she would not wear "anything else to go ride around in a storm".

Critical reception
"Fearless" has received critical acclaim. Alice Fisher of The Guardian praised "Fearless" for its "perceptive lyrics about universal truths that can be enjoyed at any age." Jim Harrington of The San Jose Mercury News expressed a similar sentiment in a review of Swift's Fearless Tour: "Moms and daughters, as well as groups of teens and couples out for a date night, [can sing] along with equal gusto." Jody Rosen of Rolling Stone chose the song as a highlight from Fearless, applauding its "loud, lean guitars and rousing choruses." Retrospectively, critics have remained favorable towards the imagery and passion of the lyrics. Nate Jones of Vulture ranked the song as her 25th best song (out of 173 ranked in total), highlighting that the emotion Swift invested into the lyrics "is matched in the way she tumbles from line to line into the chorus." Rolling Stone's Rob Sheffield ranked it 29th, opining that Swift makes even some of her most common tropes feel fresh. Jules Lefevre of Junkee ranked it as the third best song on Fearless, similarly praising the presence of Swift's most common imagery and describing the song as captivating. In a review of Fearless (Taylor's Version), a reviewer for Clash Magazine retrospectively described "Fearless" as a "first kiss soundtrack".

Commercial performance
After its digital release, on the issue dated November 1, 2008, "Fearless" debuted and peaked at number nine on the Billboard Hot 100 with sales of 162,000 digital downloads. Following its single release, the song re-entered the Billboard Hot 100 at number 99 on the week ending February 20, 2010. Its highest position on the chart while being released as a single was number 76 on the week ending April 10, 2010; it ultimately spent 15 weeks on the Hot 100. The song is one of 13 songs from Fearless charted within the top 40 of the Billboard Hot 100, breaking the record for the most top 40 entries from a single album. "Fearless" also peaked at number ten on the Hot Country Songs chart and spent 19 weeks on the chart, making it Swift's tenth consecutive top ten hit but also her lowest-charting single, and 27 on the Country Digital Song Sales chart, where it spent 15 weeks. The single was certified gold by the Recording Industry Association of America (RIAA) for the sale of over 500,000 units on October 12, 2009, before its official release as a single on January 4, 2010, therefore becoming the first single to be certified gold before being released as an official single. "Fearless" was certified platinum by the RIAA on October 23, 2012, and had sold a million copies in the United States by November 2017.

On the week ending November 29, 2008, "Fearless" debuted and peaked at number sixty-nine in Canada, spending a total of five weeks on the chart. It eventually reached number 7 on the Canadian Country Airplay chart. The song peaked at number thirty-two in Spain.

Accolades

Live performances

Swift's first televised performance of "Fearless" was on November 10, 2008, on the Late Show with David Letterman. She went on to perform the song on The Ellen DeGeneres Show and Clear Channel Communications's Stripped. Swift performed the song on all venues of her first headlining concert tour, the Fearless Tour, which ran from April 23, 2009, to July 10, 2010. During each performance, Swift escorted a silver sparkly dress and black boots and played an acoustic guitar as floral patterns with a moving butterfly were projected on the stage. Alice Fisher of The Observer attended the May 7, 2009 concert at Shepherd's Bush Empire in London and said that while Swift drifted off during the performance, it "clearly made perfect sense to the girls in the audience."

The song was also performed on the Speak Now World Tour, in a mashup with Jason Mraz's "I'm Yours" and Train's "Hey Soul Sister". Swift performed the song, acoustically, on selected dates during both The Red Tour and The 1989 World Tour. In 2018, she performed it, in place of "All Too Well", during the second East Rutherford show at Metlife Stadium on her Reputation Stadium Tour.

Music video
Various performances from the Fearless Tour were used to comprise a music video for "Fearless", directed by Todd Cassetty. The video premiered on February 17, 2010, on CMT. It begins when Swift tells her band before they step onstage, "You guys, this tour has been the best experience of my entire life." The video intermingles footage from the tour itself with fans excitedly showing off signs to Swift with behind-the-scenes footage of Swift and her band as they travel on the Fearless Tour. The video ends with Swift waving goodbye as she exits the stage. Jocelyn Vena of MTV News interpreted it to be "Swift's love letter to her fans", as it showed an "inside view of what it's like to go on tour". As of July 2021, the video has accumulated over 58.4 million views on YouTube.

Charts

Weekly charts

Year-end charts

Certifications

"Fearless (Taylor's Version)"

"Fearless (Taylor's Version)" is a song recorded by American singer-songwriter Taylor Swift. The re-recorded version of Swift's 2008 song "Fearless", it is the opening track of Swift's first re-recorded album of the same name, a re-recording of her 2008 album Fearless. Fearless (Taylor's Version) was released on April 9, 2021, through Republic Records. Swift wrote the song with Liz Rose and Hillary Lindsey and produced it with Christopher Rowe. "Fearless (Taylor's Version)" replicates the lyrics, production, and instrumentation of the original "Fearless".

Upon the release of Fearless (Taylor's Version), "Fearless (Taylor's Version)" debuted at 71 on the Billboard Hot 100, 14 on the Hot Country Songs chart, and 36 on the Rolling Stone Top 100. The song additionally charted at number 26 in Singapore, 46 in Canada, 53 on the Billboard Global 200, and 54 in Australia.

Background and release
On February 11, 2021, following a dispute with Big Machine Records over the rights to the masters of her first six studio albums, Taylor Swift announced that the first of her re-recorded albums, Fearless (Taylor's Version), a re-recording of Swift's 2008 album, Fearless. On April 8, a snippet of the song was teased on Good Morning America. Fearless (Taylor's Version) was released on April 9, 2021. The song was also included in Fearless (Taylor's Version): The I Remember What You Said Last Night Chapter, a streaming compilation by Swift released on May 24, 2021, featuring five other songs from Fearless (Taylor's Version).

Critical reception 
In a review of Fearless (Taylor's Version), Hannah Mylrea of NME described the title track as brilliant, praising its "starry-eyed lyricism" and "stellar instrumental arrangements" that elicit memories of Swift's older music while simultaneously being much more refined in its production. A reviewer for Clash magazine highlighted Swift's improved vocals and the crisper production while also pinpointing the nostalgia the song evokes.

Commercial performance 

Following the release of Fearless (Taylor's Version), its title track debuted at number 71 on the Billboard Hot 100 alongside 7 other tracks from Fearless (Taylor's Version). It debuted at number 36 on the Rolling Stone Top 100, with 64,100 units sold and 7.6 million streams in its first week. "Fearless (Taylor's Version)" debuted at number 14 on the Hot Country Songs chart, one of 18 songs from the album charting simultaneously, and 6 on the Country Streaming Songs chart. Internationally, "Fearless (Taylor's Version)" debuted at number 26 in Singapore, 46 in Canada, 53 on the Billboard Global 200, and 54 in Australia.

Credits and personnel 
Credits adapted from Tidal

 Taylor Swift – vocals, songwriting, production
 Hillary Lindsey – songwriting
 Liz Rose – songwriting
 Christopher Rowe – production, vocal engineering
 Mike Meadows – acoustic guitar, twelve-string guitar, background vocals, Hammond B3, mandolin
 Derek Garten – engineering
 John Hanes – engineering
 Lowell Reynolds – engineering, recording
 David Payne – recording
 Caitlin Evanson – background vocals
 Paul Sidoti – background vocals, electric guitar
 Amos Heller – bass
 Matt Billingslea – drums
 Max Bernstein – electric guitar
 John Yudkin – fiddle
 Randy Merrill – mastering
 Serban Ghenea – mixing

Chart performance

References

2008 songs
2010 singles
Taylor Swift songs
American pop rock songs
Songs written by Taylor Swift
Songs written by Hillary Lindsey
Songs written by Liz Rose
Song recordings produced by Nathan Chapman (record producer)
Song recordings produced by Taylor Swift
Song recordings produced by Chris Rowe
Big Machine Records singles
Country pop songs